Johan Andersson may refer to:

Footballers
 Johan Andersson (footballer, born 1974), Swedish footballer
 Johan Andersson (footballer, born 1983), Swedish footballer
 Johan Andersson (footballer, born June 1995), Swedish footballer
 Johan Andersson (footballer, born May 1995), Swedish footballer

Ice hockey players
 H. Johan Andersson (born 1984), Swedish ice hockey player
 Johan A. Andersson (born 1984), Swedish ice hockey player
 Johan Andersson (ice hockey, born 1987), Swedish ice hockey player

Other people
 Johan Andersson (wrestler) (1889–1965), Swedish Olympic wrestler
 Johan Gunnar Andersson (1874–1960), Swedish archaeologist, paleontologist and geologist
 Johan Andersson (game developer) (born 1974), Swedish game programmer
 Johan Andersson (artist) (born 1986), Swedish painter

See also
Johan Anderson (born 1971), Australian tennis player
Johan Andersen (disambiguation)
 Andersson